Bogangar is a town in the Tweed Shire located in north-eastern New South Wales, Australia, and includes Cudgen Lake, Norries Headland and the locality of Cabarita Beach on the east. Locally, the names Bogangar and Cabarita Beach are interchangeable, with more residents choosing to use the latter. In the 2016 Census, Bogangar had a population of 3,060.

Bogangar takes its name from the Bandjalang-Yugambeh dialect chain word `bobingah' meaning a highland.

History
The word Bogangar is of Aboriginal origin and literally means "a place of many pippies" and tiny molluscs were once encountered along the shorelines of the Pacific. 

Bogangar Public School was opened on 16 February 2004.

See also
Cabarita Beach, New South Wales
Northern Rivers

References

Towns in New South Wales
Suburbs of Tweed Heads, New South Wales
Coastal towns in New South Wales